Country After All These Years is the forty-ninth studio album by guitarist Chet Atkins. It would be his last recording for RCA Victor after 35 years with the label, and as a fitting parting gift, the album won the 1982 Grammy Award for Best Country Instrumental Performance. Chet was also nominated in the same category that year for Reflections, his collaboration with Doc Watson.

Track listing

Side one
 "Orange Blossom Special" (Ervin Rouse, Robert Wise)
 "Ready for the Times to Get Better" (Reynolds)
 "On the Road Again" (Willie Nelson)
 "Storms Never Last" (Colter)
 "Wildwood Flower" (Carter)

Side two
 "Heart of Glass" (Deborah Harry, Chris Stein)
 "Sugar Bush"
 "Let 'Em In" (Paul McCartney)
 "I Can Hear Kentucky Calling Me"

Personnel
Chet Atkins – guitar

References
Chet Atkins official website discography

Chet Atkins albums
1981 albums
RCA Records albums